This is a list of notable painters from, or associated with, Kazakhstan.

B
Dilka Bear (born 1977)

D
Agimsaly Duzelkhanov (born 1951)

G
Aisha Galimbaeva (1917-2008)

K
Sergey Kalmykov (1891-1967)
Abilkhan Kasteev (1904-1973)

N
Zhenis Kakenuly Nurlybayev (born 1965)

Kazakhstani painters
Kazakh painters
Painters